The Atlantic Adventure (Swedish: Atlantäventyret) is a 1934 Swedish comedy film directed by Lorens Marmstedt and Edvin Adolphson and starring Birgit Tengroth, Valdemar Dalquist and Margit Manstad. It was shot at the Råsunda Studios in Stockholm. The film's sets were designed by the art director Arne Åkermark.

Cast
 Birgit Tengroth as Tusse Telmi
 Valdemar Dalquist as Freddy Alsterberg, Theatrical Manager
 Edvin Adolphson as First Mate
 Margit Manstad as Rita Grey
 John Ekman as Baron Winkelstein
 Carl-Gunnar Wingård as van Haag, Dutch Jeweller 
 Carl Ström as Captain
 Gunnar Olsson as 	Bob Holgert, Machinist
 Emmy Albiin as 	Old Woman 
 Carl Andersson as 	Utmätningsmannens biträde 
 Sven Arefeldt as 	Båtpassagerare 
 Bror Berger as 	Johansson 
 Allan Bohlin as Besättingsman 
 Rolf Botvid as Dansande man 
 Artur Cederborgh as 	Jocke Svensson 
 Annalisa Ericson as 	Cleaning Lady 
 Carl Ericson as 	Maskinchef 
 Emil Fjellström as 	Besättingsman 
 Karin Granberg as 	Kvinna i baren 
 Wilhelm Haqvinius as 	Man vid gripandet av Winkelstein 
 Carl Harald as Utmätningsmannens biträde 
 Håkan Jahnberg as 	Berusad man 
 Helge Kihlberg as 	Hovmästare 
 Börje Lundh as Stewarden med telegram 
 Sven Magnusson as 	Besättingsman 
 John Melin as 	Besättningsman 
 Nils Nordståhl as Båtpassagerare 
 Yngve Nyqvist as 	Båtpassagerare 
 Knut Pehrson as 	Båtpassagerare 
 Stina Ståhle as 	Båtpassagerare 
 Harald Svensson as 	Dansande man 
 Ilse-Nore Tromm as Dansande kvinna 
 Nils Wahlbom as 	Utmätningsmannen 
 Tom Walter as 	Besättningsman

References

Bibliography 
 Qvist, Per Olov & von Bagh, Peter. Guide to the Cinema of Sweden and Finland. Greenwood Publishing Group, 2000.

External links 
 

1934 films
Swedish comedy films
1934 comedy films
1930s Swedish-language films
Films directed by Lorens Marmstedt
Films directed by Edvin Adolphson
Swedish black-and-white films
Swedish films based on plays
1930s Swedish films